Orthogonius femoralis is a species of ground beetle in the subfamily Orthogoniinae. It was described by Maximilien Chaudoir in 1848.

References

femoralis
Beetles described in 1848